
Gerald Cumberland is the  pseudonym of the British author, journalist, poet, and composer Charles Frederick Kenyon (1879-1926). Kenyon was a librettist, a writer of essays and of some pieces of police literature.

Trained as a musician, for several years Kenyon was the drama and music critic of Daily Critic. In 1901 under his own as name, he produced a study of the work of the writer and playwright Hall Caine and in 1904, a work for beginner musicians.

As a composer, his musical scores included The Maiden and the Flower Garden  (1914), an operetta for children. The orchestration by Julius Harrison of his Cleopatra cantata helped the young Harrison towards recognition as a composer.
 
In 1919 he used the pseudonym Gerald Cumberland to publish his "Books of Reminiscences", two important critical essays on musical life in England, as well some works of police literature. His book Set Down in Malice was partly based on his two extensive interviews (1906 and 1913) of Edward Elgar, and also describes a meeting with G.B.Shaw as A Terrible Walk.

Works

Novels 
 A Lover st Forty (1900)
 The Poisoner (1921) 
 The Cypress Chest (1927)

Short stories 
 Tales of a Cruel Country (1919)

Novella 
 Any Man Who Drinks (1925)

Other publications

As Gerald Cumberland 
 Set Down in Malice: a Book of Reminiscences (1919)
 Written in Friendship: a Book of Reminiscences (1924)

As Charles Frederick Kenyon (ou C. Fred Kenyon) 
 Hall Caine, the Man and the Novelist (1901)
 How to Memorize Music (1904)

Compositions 
 Day and Night (1906), song for tenor and piano
 If I Could Speak (1906), song for tenor and piano
 When I Lie ill (1906), song for tenor and piano
 Soliloquy Upon a Dead Child (1906), song for soprano or tenor and piano
 The Vision of Cleopatra (1907), cantata for soloists, choir and orchestra.
 Fairies’ Song (1906), a cappella for two sopranos and two altos.
 The Maiden and the Flower Garden (1914), operetta for children's voices and piano
 The Moon (1914), song for soprano, alto and piano
 The River (1914), song for soprano, alto and piano
 Summer Has Come, Little Children (1914), song for soprano, alto and piano

References 

English composers
English male poets
English essayists
1879 births
1926 deaths
English male non-fiction writers